Sucedió en La Habana ("It Happened in Havana") is a 1938 Cuban film. It stars Luana Alcañiz (as Luana de Alcañiz), Juan Torena, Rita Montaner and Carlos Orellana. One of the must successful and ambitious Cuban films during the 1930s. The film is a combination of music, romance and comedy, in which a Cuban young woman falls in love with an engineer working in her father's sugar mill, with many funny scenes provided by comedians Garrido and Piñero, and musical interludes featuring artists as the Havana Casino Orchestra, the Milanés Sisters, Ignacio Piñeiro's Septet, Guyún, and singers María de los Ángeles Santana and Margot Alvariño.

External links
 
Sucedio En La Habana (1938)

1938 films
1930s Spanish-language films
Cuban black-and-white films
1938 comedy films
Cuban comedy films
1930s Mexican films